1 Timothy 4 is the fourth chapter of the First Epistle to Timothy  in the New Testament of the Christian Bible. The author has been traditionally identified as Paul the Apostle since as early as AD 180, although most modern scholars consider the letter pseudepigraphical, perhaps written as late as the first half of the second century AD.

This chapter deals with future false teachers (verses 1-6), giving directions to Timothy in reference to them (verses 7-11), and concludes with further general exhortations to Timothy (verses 12-16).

Text

The original text was written in Koine Greek. This chapter is divided into 16 verses.

Textual witnesses
Some early manuscripts containing the text of this chapter are:
Papyrus 133 (200–300; extant verses 3:13–4:8)
Codex Sinaiticus (330–360)
Codex Alexandrinus (400–440)
Codex Ephraemi Rescriptus (c. 450; complete)
Codex Freerianus (c. 450; extant verses 1–3, 10–13)
Uncial 061 (c. 450; extant verses 1–3)
Codex Claromontanus (c. 550)

Some writers suggest that the Dead Sea Scrolls contain fragments of Timothy and other Christian Greek scriptures (such as that 7Q4 contains verses 4:1–3), but this view is rejected by the majority of scholars.

The emergence of heresy (4:1–5)

Verse 1
Now the Spirit expressly says that in latter times some will depart from the faith, giving heed to deceiving spirits and doctrines of demons.
The Greek ἐν ὑστέροις καιροῖς (en husterois kairois) is translated as "latter times" in the King James Version and some other translations. Others refer to "later times". Commentator Henry Alford argues that the writer here "speaks only of times subsequent to those in which he was writing" and warns that the words should not be read with the "last times" in mind.

The charge to Timothy (4:6–16)

Verse 9
This is a faithful saying and worthy of all acceptation.
"This is a faithful saying": is a formula assuming 'general acceptance' and is stated five times in the Pastoral Epistles (1 Timothy 1:15; 3:1; 4:9; 2 Timothy 2:11; Titus 3:8).

Verse 10
For to this end we both labor and suffer reproach, because we trust in the living God, who is the Savior of all men, especially of those who believe.
"Savior" (Greek:): the last of three times in this letter (others: 1:1; 2:3) where God is called "Savior", recalling the 'well-known appellation of Yahweh in the Greek Old Testament' (for examples, LXX ; ; ; ; ; ; ;).

Verse 16
Take heed to yourself and to the doctrine. Continue in them, for in doing this you will save both yourself and those who hear you.
 "Take heed unto yourself": theologian John Gill suggests this should be read not only as a Christian, but also as a minister, because every minister should be cautious that his conducts could be exemplary to his gifts to be used and improved, not to be infected with heresies; that he feed his flock with knowledge and understanding according to the Scriptures, the teaching of Christ and his apostles, according to godliness, so it tend purely to edification and is expressed in the best way and that he defend it against all opposition. 

 "Continue in them": or "with them", that is, the church members at Ephesus to stay in the doctrines of the Gospel, even though rejected by the learned, wise, and rich people and though loaded with reproach and persecuted, even to death. 

 "For in doing this, you will both save yourself and those who hear you": that is, by paying attention to himself and the doctrine, a minister saves himself from the pollution of the world, from the heresies of false teachers, to be an example to the congregation and faithfully preach the Gospel to his audience for their eternal salvation, about Jesus Christ as the only Savior, thus being the joyful instruments of converting sinners, and saving them from eternal death (cf. ).

See also
 Bishop
 Presbyter
 Jesus Christ
 Related Bible parts: 1 Timothy 6, 2 Timothy 1, 2 Peter 2

References

Sources

External links
 King James Bible - Wikisource
English Translation with Parallel Latin Vulgate
Online Bible at GospelHall.org (ESV, KJV, Darby, American Standard Version, Bible in Basic English)
Multiple bible versions at Bible Gateway (NKJV, NIV, NRSV etc.)

04